Mycological Progress is a peer-reviewed scientific journal covering the study of fungi including lichens. It is published by Springer Science+Business Media on behalf of the German Mycological Society. Its editor in chief is Franz Oberwinkler.

History
The journal was established in February 2002 by the German Mycological Society under founding editor-in-chief, Franz Oberwinkler (University of Tübingen). The current editor-in-chief is Marco Thines, who is also the president of the German Mycological Society. Originally published by botanical publisher, IHW-Verlag (Eching), the title transferred to Springer in 2006 by which time it was the official journal of ten European national mycological societies. It was published quarterly until 2015 when it converted to continuous publication online and production of the printed version ceased.

Abstracting and indexing
The journal is abstracted and indexed in:

According to the Journal Citation Reports, the journal has a 2018 impact factor of 2.0.

References

External links 
 

Publications established in 2002
Mycology journals
English-language journals
Springer Science+Business Media academic journals
Lichenology